The Shah-Armens (lit. 'Kings of Armenia'), also known as Ahlatshahs (lit. 'Rulers of Ahlat'), was a Turkmen Sunni Muslim Anatolian beylik founded after the Battle of Manzikert (1071) and centred in Ahlat on the northwestern shore of the Lake Van. This region comprised most of modern-day Bitlis and Van, and parts of Muş provinces.

The dynasty is sometimes also called Sökmenli in reference to the founder of the principality, Sökmen el-Kutbî, literally "Sökmen the Slave", one of the commanders of the Alp Arslan. The Ahlatshah Sökmenli should not be confused with the Sökmen, which ruled in Hasankeyf during approximately the same period.
Another title Sökmen and his descendants assumed, as heirs to the local Armenian princes according to Clifford Edmund Bosworth, was the Persian title Shah-i Arman ("Shah of Armenia"), often rendered as Ermenshahs. This dynastic name, which the rulers adopted, was established through the "ethnic make-up and political history" of the region they ruled, which was primarily Armenian.

The Beylik was founded by the Sökmen el-Kutbî who took over Ahlat (Khliat or Khilat) in 1100. Ahlatshahs were closely tied to Great Seljuq institutions, although they also followed independent policies like the wars against Georgia in alliance with their neighbours to the north, the Saltukids. They also acquired links with the branch of the Artuqids based in Meyyafarikin (now Silvan), becoming part of a nexus of principalities in Upper Mesopotamia and Eastern Anatolia.

The Ahlatshahs reached their brightest period under the fifty-seven-year reign of Sökmen II (1128–1185). He was married to a female relative (daughter or sister) of the Saltukid ruler Saltuk II. Since Sökmen II was childless, the beylik was seized by a series of slave commanders after his death. In 1207, the beylik was taken over by the Ayyubids, who had long coveted Ahlat. The Ayyubids had come to the city at the invitation of people of Ahlat after the last Sökmenli ruler was killed by Tuğrulshah, the ruler (melik) of Erzurum on behalf of the Sultanate of Rum and brother of Sultan Kayqubad I.

The Ahlatshahs left a large number of historic tombstones in and around the city of Ahlat. Local administrators are currently trying to have the tombstones included in UNESCO's World Heritage List, where they are currently listed tentatively.

Gallery

List of Shah-Armens 

 Sökmen I (1100–1111)
 Zahireddin İbrahim (1111–1127)
 Ahmet (1127–1128)
 Nasireddin Muhammed Sökmen II (1128–1185)
 Seyfettin Beytemür (1185–1193)
 Bedreddin Aksungur (1193–1198)
 Şücaüddin Kutluğ (1198)
 Melikülmansur Muhammed (1198–1206)
 Izzeddin Balaban (1206–1207)

See also
 List of Sunni Muslim dynasties

References

Sources
 Claude Cahen, Pre-Ottoman Turkey

External links

 (limited preview) 

Anatolian beyliks
Western Armenia
History of Bitlis Province
History of Van Province
States and territories established in the 1100s
Seljuk dynasty
1071 establishments in Asia
1207 disestablishments in Asia
States and territories disestablished in the 1200s
Sunni dynasties